Ropley railway station is a railway station in Ropley, Hampshire, England, which opened in 1865 and reopened in 1977 after four years' closure, to be served by steam and select diesel trains on the Watercress Line which shares its terminus at Alton railway station along with the more major Alton Line.

History
The station was opened by the Mid-Hants (Alton Lines) Railway (MHR) on 2 October 1865. The MHR was leased to the London and South Western Railway (LSWR) in August 1880, which fully absorbed the MHR in June 1884. The LSWR amalgamated with other railways to form the Southern Railway on 1 January 1923.

The station was destaffed in 1967 and closed by British Rail on 5 February 1973.

Preservation

Ropley railway station was reopened by the Mid Hants Railway (Watercress Line) on 30 April 1977.

The main locomotive shed and workshops for the Mid Hants Railway are just to the east of Ropley station.

The station gardens feature notable yew topiary, which has been in situ for over 100 years (an 1898 postcard shows the topiary well established).

A footbridge was added to the western end of the station in 1986.

A  gauge miniature railway opened in 2015. This railway was previously running in the Top Car Park of Ropley station from 2009 until 2012.

Footbridge 
In 2012–13, a footbridge, originally at King's Cross station in London, was dismantled to connect instead the raised picnic area, orchard and children's play areas to the buildings at Ropley station taking in for part of its length the maintenance shed, where passengers can walk over and view the works below.

Route

References

External links

Heritage railway stations in Hampshire
Former London and South Western Railway stations
Railway stations in Great Britain opened in 1865
Railway stations in Great Britain closed in 1973
Beeching closures in England
Railway stations in Great Britain opened in 1977